George Washington McCoppin (November 3, 1904 - July 1, 1993) was a former Texas House member who served in the House from 1957-1963.

Life
McCoppin was born on November 3, 1904 to Edward Richard McCoppin and Zema Phillips. He married Alice Ann Johnson and had 2 children together. Their children are named George Edward McCoppin (1936-?) and Sally Beth McCoppin (1939-?). McCoppin died on July 1, 1993 at the age of 88. He is buried at Hillcrest Cemetery in Texarkana.

References

1904 births
1993 deaths
20th-century American politicians
Democratic Party members of the Texas House of Representatives